Draper is a small lunar impact crater in the southern part of the Mare Imbrium. It is a circular, cup-shaped formation, with a tiny craterlet intruding into the northeastern rim. To the north-northeast is the crater Pytheas, and to the south lies the Montes Carpatus range. Just to the southeast is the slightly smaller crater identified as Draper C. The crater is named after American astronomer Henry Draper.

Satellite craters
By convention these features are identified on lunar maps by placing the letter on the side of the crater midpoint that is closest to Draper.

References

External links

Draper at The Moon Wiki

Impact craters on the Moon
Mare Imbrium